The 1937 Ilford by-election was held on 29 June 1937.  The by-election was held due to the resignation of the incumbent Conservative MP, George Hamilton.  It was won by the Conservative candidate Geoffrey Hutchinson.

References

Ilford by-election
Ilford,1937
Ilford by-election
Ilford,1937
Ilford,1937
1930s in Essex
Ilford